Závadka may refer to:

 Závadka, Gelnica District, Slovakia
 Závadka, Humenné District, Slovakia
 Závadka, Michalovce District, Slovakia
 Zavadka, Skole Raion, Ukraine